James Allen Dickey (born April 2, 1954) is an American college basketball coach  who was most recently an assistant coach at Oklahoma State University. He previously served as the men's head coach at Texas Tech University from 1991 to 2001, where he led the Red Raiders to the NCAA tournament in 1993 and again in 1996, and at the University of Houston from 2010 to 2014.

Biography

Early years
Dickey attended Valley Springs High School, where he played basketball from 1970 to 1972.  He later played for Central Arkansas from 1972 to 1976.

Coaching career
Dickey's best team was the Texas Tech's 1996 unit, which finished 30–2, including an undefeated record in the final season of Southwest Conference play.  They won the SWC conference tournament and advanced all the way to the Sweet 16 of the NCAA Tournament.

The Raiders moved to the Big 12 for the 1996–97 season, and appeared to pick up right where they left off with a solid 19–9 season.  It was discovered during the inaugural Big 12 basketball tournament, however, that two players had played the entire season while academically ineligible. Hours after the team's first-round game, Texas Tech announced that it was withdrawing from postseason consideration and forfeiting its entire conference schedule.  The Raiders had lost that game, and would have had to forfeit it if they had won.

A subsequent investigation revealed massive violations dating back to 1990 in men's basketball and nine other sports (though Dickey himself was not personally implicated).  As a result, the NCAA stripped Tech of its two NCAA tournament wins in 1996 and docked it nine scholarships over four years.  The lost scholarships were too much for Dickey to overcome, and he tallied four straight losing seasons before being fired in 2001.

He was announced as the head coach of the Houston Cougars on April 1, 2010.

After four seasons and a 64–62 record, Dickey resigned his position as head coach.

Head coaching record

College

*Texas Tech vacated its 1996 NCAA tournament appearance due to ineligible players; official record is 28–1.
**Texas Tech forfeited its entire 1996–97 conference slate due to ineligible players, but Dickey was ruled not to have been affected.
†Official record at Texas Tech is 164–123 without vacated games.

References

1954 births
Living people
American men's basketball coaches
American men's basketball players
Arkansas Razorbacks men's basketball coaches
Central Arkansas Bears basketball players
College men's basketball head coaches in the United States
Harding Bisons men's basketball coaches
Houston Cougars men's basketball coaches
Kentucky Wildcats men's basketball coaches
Oklahoma State Cowboys basketball coaches
Texas Tech Red Raiders basketball coaches
Place of birth missing (living people)
High school basketball coaches in the United States
Shooting guards